Krzysztof Komorowski (born 1947) is a Polish historian specializing in the Polish military history, as well as a (retired) officer of the Polish Army with the rank of colonel. A lecturer at the Military University of Technology and National Defence University of Warsaw.

Selected works 

 Gwardia Ludowa (1987)
 Konspiracja pomorska 1939-1947: leksykon (1993)
 Powstanie Warszawskie 1944  (1994)
 Armia Krajowa (1994, 1996)
 Wacław Lipiński: żołnierz, historyk, publicysta (1999)
 Polityka i walka: konspiracja zbrojna ruchu narodowego, 1939-1945 (2000)
 Bitwa o Warszawę '44: militarne aspekty Powstania Warszawskiego (2004)
 Anty-Katyń: jeńcy sowieccy w niewoli polskiej : fakty i mity (2006), also published in English as Anti-Katyń: Soviet Prisoners of War in Poland : Facts and Myths (2006)
 Katyń: zbrodnia nieukarana (2009)
 Boje polskie 1939-1945: przewodnik encyklopedyczny (2009)

References 

1947 births
Living people
20th-century Polish historians
Polish male non-fiction writers
Polish Army officers
Knights of the Order of Polonia Restituta
Recipients of the Pro Memoria Medal
Recipients of the Medal of Merit for National Defence
Military historians
21st-century Polish historians